Elizabeth Mure (est. born 2 March 1320 - died before May 1355), a member of Clan Muir, was the first wife of Robert, High Steward of Scotland, and Guardian of Scotland (1338–1341 and from October 1346), who later became King Robert II of Scotland. 

Because their marriage was originally not sanctioned in a church, but what today would be called a common-law marriage, Elizabeth is often identified as his mistress.

Life 

Elizabeth Mure was said to be born at Rowallan Castle. Her parents were Sir Adam Mure of Rowallan, Ayrshire, and Janet Mure of Pokelly, Ayr, South Ayrshire. Through her father, Elizabeth Mure may be a descendant of Fergus of Galloway (est. 1078 - 1161) and his wife Elizabeth FitzRoy (est. 1109 - 1160), the illegitimate daughter of King Henry I of England, and a member of the House of Normandy. The Muirs/Mures also claim descent from King Fergus Mór of Dál Riata, per the history of Clan Muir.

In 1336, Elizabeth married Robert Stewart, then High Steward of Scotland. The marriage was criticized as uncanonical, so they remarried in 1349, following a papal dispensation dated at Avignon 22 November 1347. They had at least ten children, with some accounts saying as many as thirteen. Doubts about the validity of their marriage led to disputes over their children's right to the crown.

Elizabeth died before her husband inherited the crown at the age of 55 in 1371, and he later remarried (Papal Dispensation dated 2 May 1355). On 27 March 1371, "The Lord John (who later took the title of King Robert III, changing his name because of what he saw as John de Baliol's unpatriotic desecration of the name John), Earl of Carrick and Steward of Scotland, first-born son of King Robert II" was declared heir to the Crown by Parliament in Scone Abbey.

Issue 

 Robert III (c. 1337 – 4 April 1406), born John Stewart, Earl of Carrick
 Walter Stewart, Lord of Fife (c.1338–1362)
 Robert Stewart, Duke of Albany (c. 1340–1420)
 Alexander Stewart, Earl of Buchan (1343 – c. 20 July 1405)
 Margaret Stewart, married John of Islay, Lord of the Isles
 Marjorie Stewart, married firstly, John Dunbar, Earl of Moray, and secondly, Sir Alexander Keith
 Johanna (Jean) Stewart, married firstly, Sir John Keith, secondly, Sir John Lyon, and thirdly in 1384, Sir James Sandilands.
 Isabella Stewart, married firstly, James Douglas, 2nd Earl of Douglas, and secondly, John Edmonstone of that Ilk
 Katherine Stewart, married Sir Robert Logan of Grugar and Restalrig, Lord High Admiral of Scotland
 Elizabeth Stewart, married Sir Thomas Hay, Lord High Constable of Scotland

See also
Polnoon Castle - Elizabeth Mure was the great-great-granddaughter of John Montgomerie

Notes

References
 Dunbar, Sir Archibald H., Bt., Scottish Kings, a Revised Chronology of Scottish History 1005 - 1625, Edinburgh, 1899, p. 160-1.
 McAndrew, Bruce A., Scotlands Historic Heraldry, Boydell Press, 2006: 

1355 deaths
Mistresses of Scottish royalty
14th-century Scottish women
Year of birth unknown
14th-century Scottish people